Arthur H. Johnstone served as the Chief Scout and later President of the Boy Scouts of South Africa.
In 1971, Johnstone was awarded the 66th Bronze Wolf, the only distinction of the World Organization of the Scout Movement, awarded by the World Scout Committee for exceptional services to world Scouting.

References

External links

Recipients of the Bronze Wolf Award
Year of birth missing
Scouting and Guiding in South Africa